The 1972 season of the Venezuelan Primera División, the top category of Venezuelan football, was played by 9 teams. The national champions were Deportivo Italia.

Results

First Stage

Second Stage

Second Place Playoff

Final stage

Second Place Playoff

External links 
Venezuela 1972 season at RSSSF

Ven
Venezuelan Primera División seasons
Prim